The Particle Data Group (or PDG) is an international collaboration of particle physicists that compiles and reanalyzes published results related to the properties of particles and fundamental interactions.  It also publishes reviews of theoretical results that are phenomenologically relevant, including those in related fields such as cosmology. The PDG currently publishes the Review of Particle Physics and its pocket version, the Particle Physics Booklet, which are printed biennially as books, and updated annually via the World Wide Web.

In previous years, the PDG has published the Pocket Diary for Physicists, a calendar with the dates of key international conferences and contact information of major high energy physics institutions, which is now discontinued. PDG also further maintains the standard numbering scheme for particles in event generators, in association with the event generator authors.

Review of Particle Physics
The Review of Particle Physics (formerly Review of Particle Properties, Data on Particles and Resonant States, and Data on Elementary Particles and Resonant States) is a voluminous, 1,200+ page reference work which summarizes particle properties and reviews the current status of elementary particle physics, general relativity and big-bang cosmology. Usually singled out for citation analysis, it is currently the most cited article in high energy physics, being cited more than 2,000 times annually in the scientific literature.

The Review is currently divided into 3 sections:
 Particle Physics Summary Tables—Brief tables of particles: gauge and higgs bosons, leptons, quarks, mesons, baryons, constraints for the search for hypothetical particles and violation of physical laws.
 Reviews, Tables and Plots—Review of fundamental concepts from mathematics and statistics, table of Clebsch-Gordan coefficients, periodic table of elements, table of electronic configuration of the elements, brief table of material properties, review of current status in the fields of Standard Model, Cosmology, and experimental method of particle physics, and with tables of fundamental physical and astronomical constants (many from CODATA and the Astronomical Almanac).
 Particle Listings—Comprehensive version of the Particle Physics Summary Tables, with all significant measurements fully referenced.

A condensed version of the Review, with the Summary Tables, a significantly shortened Reviews, Tables and Plots, and without the Particle Listings, is available as a 300-page, pocket-sized Particle Physics Booklet.

The history of Review of Particle Physics can be traced back to the 1957 article Hyperons and Heavy Mesons (Systematics and Decay) by Murray Gell-Mann and Arthur H. Rosenfeld, and the unpublished update tables for its data with the title Data for Elementary Particle Physics (University of California Radiation Laboratory Technical Report UCRL-8030) that were circulated before the actual publication of the original article. In 1963, Matts Roos independently published a compilation Data on Elementary Particles and Resonant States. On his suggestion, the two publications were merged a year later into the 1964 Data on Elementary Particles and Resonant States.

The publication underwent three renamings thereafter: 1965 into Data on Particles and Resonant States, 1970 into Review of Particle Properties, and 1996 into the present form Review of Particle Physics. Starting with 1972, the Review no longer appear exclusively in Reviews of Modern Physics, but also in Physics Letters B, European Physical Journal C, Journal of Physics G, Physical Review D, and Chinese Physics C (depending on the year).

Past editions of Review of Particle Physics

See also
 CODATA

References

External links
 Particle Data Group official site and electronic edition of Review of Particle Physics 2018
 Photo of the 2004 Review of Particle Physics
 First edition of the wallet card from the Particle Data Group, 1958
 Particle Physics Booklet, current version
 Particle Physics Booklet, July 2010
 Particle Physics Booklet, 2014
 Particle Physics Booklet, 2018

Particle physics
Physical constants